Hilihilaa is a 2001 Maldivian melodrama film written and directed by Ahmed Nimal. Produced by Shiham Rasheed under Motion Pictures, the film stars Asad Shareef, Niuma Mohamed, Ahmed Shimau, Mariyam Nazima and Sheela Najeeb in pivotal roles. The entire film was shot in K. Kaashidhoo.

Premise
Dr. Anil (Ahmed Shimau) relocates to an island to fill a vacant job at the Island's Health Centre, where he meets a stunning young lady, Lailaa (Mariyam Nazima) who happens to know all the details about Anil. His neighbor, Abdul Azeez (Ahmed Nimal) seeks medical help from Anil to diagnose his sister, Zaina (Niuma Mohamed) who is chained to bed due to her mental condition. The root cause for her adverse situation remains unknown though the locals believe she is suffering from post-traumatic stress disorder followed by the peculiar death of her husband, Haidhar (Asad Shareef).

Cast 
 Asad Shareef as Haidhar
 Niuma Mohamed as Zaina
 Mariyam Nazima as Lailaa / Nazla
 Sheela Najeeb as Haseena
 Ahmed Nimal as Abdul Azeez
 Ahmed Shah as Fazeel
 Ahmed Shimau as Dr. Anil
 Hussain Shibau as Dhoney
 Ali Rasheed as Hassan

Soundtrack

References

Maldivian drama films
2001 films
Films directed by Ahmed Nimal
2001 drama films
Dhivehi-language films